"In Your Eyes" is a song by English rock musician Peter Gabriel from his fifth solo album So (1986). It features Youssou N'Dour singing a part at the end of the song translated into his native Wolof. Gabriel's lyrics were inspired by an African tradition of ambiguity in song between romantic love and love of God.

"In Your Eyes" was not released as a single in the UK but released as the second single from So in the US, achieving strong radio airplay and regular MTV rotation. It reached No. 1 on the U.S. Billboard Mainstream Rock Tracks on 13 September 1986, and peaked at No. 26 on the Billboard Hot 100 in November. Gabriel released two extended versions of the song as a 12" vinyl single in the US. The first (The Single Mix) ran 6:15 and the version released as a single. The second (The Special Mix) ran 7:14 and was the B-Side. In Australia, "In Your Eyes" peaked at No. 97 in November 1986.

The track was featured in the teen drama film Say Anything... (1989) starring John Cusack and Ione Skye. It was also briefly used in the superhero film Deadpool 2. The song was the finale of the Secret World Tour and the final track on the 1994 Secret World Live album, where it is over 11 minutes long and includes the extra lyrics from the Special Mix, in addition to solos by the other singers and players. It was included on the US version of his 2003 compilation Hit, but not the European or Japanese versions.

In 2005, the song brought Gabriel his first Gold single, certified in the US by the RIAA.

Background
Inspired by a trip to a cathedral in Barcelona, Spain, Gabriel wrote lyrics for another So era song, "Sagrada." This song was scrapped early on, although some elements, including the vocal melody and chord changes, were transferred over to "In Your Eyes".

The song begins with a sustained keyboard chord from Gabriel. After the chord, Manu Katché enters with some worldbeat percussion rhythms played on instruments such as the African talking drum.

When determining the album's track order, Gabriel wanted to have "In Your Eyes" as the final track, but its prominent bassline meant it had to be placed earlier on the vinyl edition where the phonograph stylus had more room to vibrate. This restriction was no longer an issue for later CD releases, and the track was placed at the end of the album.

Reception
Cash Box called it a "sweet and tuneful ballad" and praised Gabriel's "plaintive voice and sensational spacious production work."  Billboard called it a "dreamily textured mood piece."

Say Anything...
The song was used twice in the 1989 US Cameron Crowe film Say Anything..., as well as its trailer. A famous scene from the film occurs when broken-hearted Lloyd Dobler serenades his ex-girlfriend, Diane Court, outside her bedroom window by holding a boombox up above his head and playing the song for her. Repopularized by its usage in the film, the song reentered the Billboard Hot 100, only reaching #41. This release was shorter, with a length of 4:53.

Crowe says that Rosanna Arquette, who is believed to be the inspiration for the song, encouraged Peter Gabriel to consider allowing the film to use the song. Gabriel asked to see Crowe's film and Crowe asked the production company to send Gabriel a rough cut. Gabriel approved the use of his song, but told Crowe that he was uneasy about the overdose of the main character at the end; the studio had erroneously sent Gabriel the film Wired instead.

In a September 2012 interview with Rolling Stone, discussing the 25th anniversary of So, Gabriel commented on the cultural impact of the scene, "It definitely gave [the song] a second life, because now it's so often parodied in comedy shows and it is one of the modern day Romeo and Juliet balcony clichés. I've talked to John Cusack about that. We're sort of trapped together in a minuscule moment of contemporary culture." In October 2012, as Gabriel played the first few bars of the song during a performance at the Hollywood Bowl, Cusack walked onto the stage, handed him a boombox and took a bow, before quickly walking off again. Cameron Crowe was also present at the concert and later tweeted "Peter Gabriel and John Cusack on stage together at the Hollywood Bowl tonight. Won't forget that... ever."

Personnel

Manu Katché – drums, talking drum, percussion
Jerry Marotta – additional drums
Larry Klein – bass
Tony Levin – bass
David Rhodes – guitars, backing vocals
Peter Gabriel – lead and backing vocals, CMI, piano, synthesizer
Richard Tee – piano
Youssou N'Dour – guest vocals
Michael Been – backing vocals
Jim Kerr – backing vocals
Ronnie Bright – bass vocals
Kevin Killen – mixer

Charts

Performances
On the This Way Up Tour tour (1986–1987), it was performed with an extended vocal duet with Youssou N'Dour, mainly during his North American concerts.

In 1993, Gabriel performed the song on Saturday Night Live, during its 18th season.

On 10 April 2014, Gabriel performed the song with an extended vocal duet with N'Dour as Gabriel was being inducted into the Rock and Roll Hall of Fame. The event, which took place at the Barclays Center in Brooklyn, New York, was filmed and was later televised in late May 2014 on the HBO cable channel.

References

Peter Gabriel songs
Songs written by Peter Gabriel
Song recordings produced by Daniel Lanois
Song recordings produced by Bill Laswell
1986 singles
Rock ballads
Geffen Records singles